is the Japanese name for the barn swallow.

Tsubame may also refer to:
 Tsubame, Niigata, a city in Japan
 Tsubame (train), the name of a Japanese train service
 Tsubame Ozuno, a character in the anime and manga series Urusei Yatsura
 Sanjō Tsubame, a character in the anime and manga series Rurouni Kenshin
 Tsubame Otori, a character in the anime and manga series Akihabara Dennou Gumi (Cyber Team in Akihabara)
 Two different satellites commonly referred to as Tsubame:
TSUBAME (satellite), a small gamma-ray observatory
Super Low Altitude Test Satellite, an experimental satellite in very low Earth orbit
 Tsubame (supercomputer), a supercomputer in Japan
 , a character in the anime and manga series Keep Your Hands Off Eizouken!
 , a character in the anime and manga series Kaguya-sama: Love Is War
 "Tsubame", a song by Yoasobi from the EP The Book 2